The Democratic Party of Ukraine (Demokratychna Partiya Ukrayni) is a political party in Ukraine registered in 1991. Until 2006 it had a parliamentary representation, but after associating itself with the People's Democratic Party, the Democratic Party disappeared from political arena.

The party did not participate in either the 2012 nor the 2014 parliamentary elections.

History
The Democratic Party of Ukraine is one of the oldest political institutions of Ukraine. The Democratic Party was founded in 1990 by a group of Ukrainian dissidents.

In the 1994 parliamentary election, the party won 2 seats. In the 1998 elections, the party was part of the Electoral bloc NEP with the Party of Economic Revival, the combination won 1,22% of the national vote; the party gained 1 (single-mandate constituency) seat. In a union with the Democratic Union the party gained 4 constituency seats during the 2002 Ukrainian parliamentary election.

In the 2006 elections, the party took part in the alliance Block of People's Democratic Parties but this alliance did not overcome the 3% threshold (winning only 0.49% of the votes) and therefore no seats. In the 30 September 2007 elections, the party failed as part of the Ukrainian Regional Asset to win parliamentary representation.

The merger of United Centre with the Democratic Party of Ukraine failed to materialize prior to the first ever congress of United Centre.

In July 2011 the chairman of the Democratic Party of Ukraine Sergey Kozachenko was sentenced to eight years in prison Kyiv District Court of Simferopol on charges of embezzling ₴65 million in credit union's "Southern".

In November 2011 the party formed a faction in the Kyiv City Council of 7 deputies, this while in the previous 2008 Kyiv City Council election the party had not won any seats.

In the 2014 Kyiv City Council election, the party won 2 seats. But in the 2015 Kyiv local election it lost these seats (it scored less than 2% of the vote).

The party did not participate in the 2014 Ukrainian parliamentary election.

Electoral results

References

External links
 Official web site

Liberal parties in Ukraine
Political parties established in 1990